Don Budge defeated Roderich Menzel 6–3, 6–2, 6–4 in the final to win the men's singles tennis title at the 1938 French Championships.

Seeds
The seeded players are listed below. Donald J. Budge is the champion; others show the round in which they were eliminated.

  Don Budge (champion)
  Franjo Punčec (semifinals)
  Roderich Menzel (finalist)
  Christian Boussus (quarterfinals)
  Ladislav Hecht (fourth round)
  Yvon Petra (first round)
  Gene Mako (third round)
  Bernard Destremau (quarterfinals)
  Adam Baworowski (fourth round)
  Frantisek Cejnar (quarterfinals)
  Dragutin Mitić (quarterfinals)
  Josip Palada (semifinals)
  Owen Anderson (fourth round)
  William Robertson (first round)
  André Martin-Legeay (second round)
  Franjo Kukuljević (fourth round)

Draw

Key
 Q = Qualifier
 WC = Wild card
 LL = Lucky loser
 r = Retired

Finals

Earlier rounds

Section 1

Section 2

Section 3

Section 4

Section 5

Section 6

Section 7

Section 8

References

External links
 

1938 in French tennis
1938